Aristeidis Moraitinis (Greek: Αριστείδης Μωραïτίνης; 1806–1875) was born in Smyrna, Ottoman Empire (now İzmir, Turkey). He was educated in France, but during the reign of King Otto, he was a staunch member of the French Party. He served as the 15th Prime Minister of Greece for a few days in February 1863 during the period between the coup d'état against King Otto and the arrival of the new Danish-born Prince William who would be known in Greece as King George I. Moraitinis was made Prime Minister a second time for a little over a month in 1868. He died in Athens 1875.

References
 John A. Petropulos; Politics and Statecraft in the Kingdom of Greece; Princeton University Press, 1968.

1806 births
1875 deaths
19th-century prime ministers of Greece
Prime Ministers of Greece
Smyrniote Greeks
Speakers of the Hellenic Parliament
Russian Party politicians